Lee Sharp (born 22 May 1975 in Glasgow) is a Scottish professional football coach and former player, who is currently assistant manager at Dundee United.

Career
Sharp signed for Clyde in July 2011. He also coached the Clyde under-19 side.

Coaching career
Following his retirement from playing, Sharp worked as a coach and then head of youth development at Clyde from 2013 to 2016. From 2016 to 2019 he was 1st team coach at Alloa Athletic, where he began his coaching partnership with Jim Goodwin. Sharp was Goodwin's assistant manager at St Mirren from 2019 to 2022. Sharp followed Goodwin to Aberdeen in February 2022 and Dundee United in March 2023.

References

External links

1975 births
Living people
Scottish footballers
Dumbarton F.C. players
Dundee F.C. players
St Mirren F.C. players
Ayr United F.C. players
Stranraer F.C. players
Clyde F.C. players
Scottish Premier League players
Scottish Football League players
Association football midfielders
Association football coaches
St Mirren F.C. non-playing staff
Aberdeen F.C. non-playing staff
Dundee United F.C. non-playing staff